The 2002 ATP Tour was the global elite men's professional tennis circuit organised by the Association of Tennis Professionals (ATP) for the 2002 tennis season. The ATP Tour is the elite tour for professional tennis organised by the ATP. The ATP Tour includes the four Grand Slam tournaments, the Tennis Masters Cup, the ATP Masters Series, the International Series Gold and the International Series tournaments.

Schedule 
The table below shows the 2002 ATP Tour schedule.

Key

January

February

March

April

May

June

July

August

September

October

November

Statistical information 
List of players and titles won (Grand Slam and Masters Cup titles in bold), listed in order of most titles won:
  Andre Agassi – Scottsdale, Miami Masters, Rome Masters, Los Angeles and Madrid Masters (5)
  Lleyton Hewitt – San Jose, Indian Wells Masters, London Queen's Club, Wimbledon and Masters Cup (5)
  Carlos Moyà – Acapulco, Båstad, Umag and Cincinnati Masters (4)
  Younes El Aynaoui – Doha, Casablanca and Munich (3)
  Roger Federer – Sydney, Hamburg Masters and Vienna (3)
  Guillermo Cañas – Chennai and Canada Masters (2)
  Àlex Corretja – Gstaad and Kitzbühel (2)
  Juan Carlos Ferrero – Monte Carlo Masters and Hong Kong (2)
  Gastón Gaudio – Barcelona and Mallorca (2)
  Fernando González – Viña del Mar and Palermo (2)
  Yevgeny Kafelnikov – Halle and Tashkent (2)
  Paul-Henri Mathieu – Moscow and Lyon (2)
  David Nalbandian – Estoril and Basel (2)
  Andy Roddick – Memphis and Houston (2)
  Greg Rusedski – Auckland and Indianapolis (2)
  Davide Sanguinetti – Milan and Delray Beach (2)
  Paradorn Srichaphan – Long Island and Stockholm (2)
  José Acasuso – Sopot (1)
  Jonas Björkman – Nottingham (1)
  James Blake – Washington, D.C. (1)
  Lars Burgsmüller – Copenhagen (1)
  Kenneth Carlsen – Tokyo (1)
  Juan Ignacio Chela – Amersfoort (1)
  Albert Costa – French Open (1)
  Taylor Dent – Newport (1)
  Thomas Enqvist – Marseille (1)
  Nicolas Escudé – Rotterdam (1)
  David Ferrer – Bucharest (1)
  Sébastien Grosjean – St. Petersburg (1)
  Tim Henman – Adelaide (1)
  Thomas Johansson – Australian Open (1)
  Gustavo Kuerten – Costa do Sauipe (1)
  Nicolás Lapentti – St. Poelten (1)
  Nicolás Massú – Buenos Aires (1)
  Marat Safin – Paris Masters (1)
  Pete Sampras – US Open (1)
  Fabrice Santoro – Dubai (1)
  Sjeng Schalken – 's-Hertogenbosch (1)
  Mikhail Youzhny – Stuttgart (1)

The following players won their first title:
  José Acasuso – Sopot
  James Blake – Washington, D.C.
  Lars Burgsmüller – Copenhagen
  Taylor Dent – Newport
  David Ferrer – Bucharest
  Gastón Gaudio – Barcelona
  Nicolás Massú – Buenos Aires
  Paul-Henri Mathieu – Moscow
  David Nalbandian – Estoril
  Davide Sanguinetti – Milan
  Paradorn Srichaphan – Long Island
  Mikhail Youzhny – Stuttgart

Titles won by nation:
  Spain 10 (Acapulco, Monte Carlos Masters, French Open, Båstad, Gstaad, Umag, Kitzbühel, Cincinnati Masters, Bucharest and Hong Kong)
  United States 10 (Memphis, Scottsdale, Miami Masters, Houston, Rome Masters, Newport, Los Angeles, Washington, D.C., US Open and Madrid Masters)
  Argentina 8 (Chennai, Estoril, Barcelona, Mallorca, Amersfoort, Sopot, Canada Masters and Basel)
  Australia 5 (San Jose, Indian Wells Masters, London Queen's Club, Wimbledon and Masters Cup)
  France 5 (Rotterdam, Dubai, Moscow, Lyon and St. Petersburg)
  Russia 4 (Halle, Stuttgart, Tashkent and Paris Masters)
  Chile 3 (Viña del Mar, Buenos Aires and Palermo)
  Morocco 3 (Doha, Casablanca and Munich)
  Sweden 3 (Australian Open, Marseille and Nottingham)
  Switzerland 3 (Sydney, Hamburg Masters and Vienna)
  United Kingdom 3 (Adelaide, Auckland and Indianapolis)
  Italy 2 (Milan and Delray Beach)
  Thailand 2 (Long Island and Stockholm)
  Brazil 1 (Costa do Sauipe)
  Denmark 1 (Tokyo)
  Ecuador 1 (St. Poelten)
  Germany 1 (Copenhagen)
  Netherlands 1 ('s-Hertogenbosch)

ATP entry rankings

Singles 
ATP rankings

Retirements 
Following is a list of notable players (winners of a main tour title, and/or part of the ATP rankings top 100 (singles) or top 50 (doubles) for at least one week) who announced their retirement from professional tennis, became inactive (after not playing for more than 52 weeks), or were permanently banned from playing, during the 2002 season:

  Karim Alami (born May 24, 1973, in Casablanca, Morocco) He turned professional in 1990 and reached his career-high ranking of no. 25 in 2000. He earned two career singles titles and one doubles title. He played his last career match in Trani, Italy in August against Potito Starace.
  Sergi Bruguera (born 16 January 1971, in Barcelona, Spain) He turned professional in 1988 and reached a career-high ranking of world no. 3. He won the French Open in 1993 and 1994 and was a semifinalist at the year-end finals in 1994. He won a silver medal at the 1996 Olympics. In doubles, he earned 3 titles and achieved a career-high ranking of world no. 49, reaching the quarterfinals of the US Open. He played his last career match in Segovia in July against Lovro Zovko.
  Magnus Gustafsson (born 3 January 1967 in Lund, Skåne, Sweden) He turned professional in 1986 and reached his career-high ranking of world no. 10 in 1991. He reached the quarterfinals of the Australian Open in 1994 and earned 14 career titles. His last match was in Stockholm in October 2001 against Jan Vacek.
  Cédric Pioline (born 15 June 1969 in Neuilly-sur-Seine, France) He turned professional in 1989 and reached a career-high ranking of no. 5. He was a finalist at the US Open in 1993 and at Wimbledon in 1997. He also won one Masters 1000 in Monte Carlo in 2000. He played his last match in October in Basel against Tim Henman.
  Patrick Rafter (born 28 December 1972) He turned professional in 1991 and reached a ranking of world no. 1 in 1999. He won the US Open in 1997 and 1998 and was a finalist at Wimbledon and a semifinalist at the Australian Open and French Open. He won 11 career ATP titles. He played his last match in Davis Cup competition in November 2001 against France.
  Pete Sampras (born August 12, 1971, in Lake Sherwood, California) Sampras debuted on the professional tour in 1988 and played his last top-level tournament in 2002 when he won the US Open, defeating rival Andre Agassi in the final. He was the year-end world no. 1 for six consecutive years (1993–1998) and won seven Wimbledon singles championships.
  Jan Siemerink (born 14 April 1970 in Rijnsburg, South Holland, Netherlands) He turned professional in 1989 and reached his career-high ranking of no. 14 in 1998. He reached the quarterfinals of Wimbledon in 1998 and earned four career singles titles. In doubles, he was ranked no. 16 in 1996 and earned 10 career titles. He played his last match in Valencia, Spain in May partnering Dennis van Scheppingen.

See also 
 2002 WTA Tour

References

External links 
 Association of Tennis Professionals (ATP) official website

 
ATP Tour
ATP Tour seasons